The mixed pairs BC3 boccia event at the 2020 Summer Paralympics will be contested between 2 and 4 September 2021 at the Ariake Gymnastics Centre. Since this event is a mixed event, both genders, male and female, compete in the event.

The competition starts with a pools stage, containing 2 pools with 5 teams each, it will be followed to the semifinals where the winners move to the finals to fight for gold and the losers will go to the bronze medal match to fight for bronze.

Rosters
Each team contains three athletes. All team has a male (M) and female (F) athlete.

Australia:
Daniel Michel (M)
Zoe Dix (M)
Jamieson Leeson (F)
Brazil:
Evelyn de Oliveira (F)
Mateus Carvalho (M)
Evani Soares da Silva Calado (F)
France:
Samir van der Beken (M)
Sonia Heckel (F)
Rodrigue Brenek (M)
Great Britain:
Jose Macedo (M)
Jorge Cardoso (M)
Celina Lourenco (F)
Greece:
Grigorios Polychronidis (M)
Anna Ntenta (F)
Anastasia Pyrgiotis (F)

Hong Kong:
Ho Yuen Kei (F)
Tse Tak Wah (M)
Liu Wing Tung (F)
Japan:
Kazuki Takahashi (M)
Keisuke Kawamoto (M)
Keiko Tanaka (F)
South Korea:
Jeong Ho-won (M)
Kim Han-soo (M)
Choi Ye-jin (F)
Portugal:
Roberto Mateus (M)
Jorge Cardoso (M)
Celina Lourenco (F)
Thailand:
Somboon Chaipanich (F)
Ekkarat Chaemchoi (M)
Ladamanee Kla-Han (F)

Results

Pool
The pools (or can be known as a group stage) will be played between 2 to 3 September 2021. The top two players in each pool will qualify to the quarterfinals.

Pool A

Pool B

Knockout stage
The knockout stage will be played on 4 September.

References

Paris BC3